Krivoglavice is a settlement on the left bank of the Lahinja River in the Municipality of Metlika in the White Carniola area of southeastern Slovenia. The railway line from Novo Mesto to Metlika runs just north of the settlement. The area is part of the traditional region of Lower Carniola and is now included in the Southeast Slovenia Statistical Region.

References

External links
Krivoglavice on Geopedia

Populated places in the Municipality of Metlika